The 2015–16 Duquesne Dukes women's basketball team will represent Duquesne University during the 2015–16 NCAA Division I women's basketball season. The Dukes, led by third year head coach Dan Burt. The Dukes were members of the Atlantic 10 Conference and play their home games at the Palumbo Center. They finished the season 28–6, 13–3 in A-10 play to share the A-10 regular season title with George Washington and Saint Louis. They advanced to the championship game of the A-10 women's tournament where they lost to George Washington. They received an at-large bid to the NCAA women's tournament for the first time in school history where they defeated Seton Hall in the first round before getting blown out by Connecticut in the second round. With 28 wins in the regular season, the most wins in school history.

2015–16 media

Duquesne Dukes Sports Network
All Duquesne Dukes home games and select road games will be broadcast by Red Zone Media with Alex Panormios and Tad Maurey providing the call. Road games not done by Red Zone Media can usually be heard on the home teams radio feed. Most home games will also be featured on the A-10 Digital Network. Select games will be televised.

Roster

Schedule

|-
!colspan=9 style="background:#00214D; color:#CC0000;"| Non-conference regular season

|-
!colspan=9 style="background:#00214D; color:#CC0000;"| Atlantic 10 regular season

|-
!colspan=9 style="background:#00214D; color:#CC0000;"| Atlantic 10 Tournament

|-
!colspan=9 style="background:#00214D; color:#CC0000;"| NCAA Women's Tournament

Rankings
2015–16 NCAA Division I women's basketball rankings

See also
 2015–16 Duquesne Dukes men's basketball team

References

Duquesne
Duquesne Dukes women's basketball seasons
Duquesne